The following is a list of the busiest airports in Paraguay. The airports are ranked by passenger traffic and aircraft movements. For each airport, the lists cite the city served by the airport, not necessarily the district where the airport is physically located.

2020

Paraguay's busiest airports by passenger traffic

Paraguay's busiest airports by aircraft movements

2019

Paraguay's busiest airports by passenger traffic

Paraguay's busiest airports by aircraft movements

2018

Paraguay's busiest airports by passenger traffic

Paraguay's busiest airports by aircraft movements

2017

Paraguay's busiest airports by passenger traffic

Paraguay's busiest airports by aircraft movements

2016

Paraguay's busiest airports by passenger traffic

Paraguay's busiest airports by aircraft movements

2015

Paraguay's busiest airports by passenger traffic

Paraguay's busiest airports by aircraft movements

2014

Paraguay's busiest airports by passenger traffic

Paraguay's busiest airports by aircraft movements

2013

Paraguay's busiest airports by passenger traffic

Paraguay's busiest airports by aircraft movements

References

Airports in Paraguay
Transport in Paraguay
Aviation in Paraguay
Aviation in South America
Airports
Paraguay
Paraguay